The Nik Family refers to the people who have the Nik title in front of their names in Malaysia. The Nik family largely originated from the state of Kelantan, which is located on the east coast of the Malaysian Peninsula. As Nik is part of the Malay Title by inheritance, it is customary for the title to be passed on to the children of a father who has the Nik title. Rarely, the title is also passed on from a mother having the Nik title. According to the history of Kelantan, the first recognised Sultan of Kelantan, Sultan Muhammad I, was also known as Nik Muhammadiah. The first king of Reman in Upper Pattani and Upper Perak was also known as Tok Nik Leh.

According to Ustaz Abdullah Nakula, a well-known writer in Kelantan, the Niks in Kelantan, Pattani (now part of southern Thailand) are believed to be the offspring of Nik Ali, who was an important official under the rulers of Pattani. Nik Ali was also known as Fakih Ali Malbari (Fakih meaning islamic jurist) and studied Islam in India. Also it is customary in Kelantan and Pattani that when a princess marries a common man, their children will bear the Nik title.

Notable members of the Nik family 
 Nik Abdul Aziz bin Nik Mat, the former Menteri Besar of Kelantan.
 Nik Ahmad Kamil bin Nik Mahmud, former Speaker of the Dewan Rakyat 
 Nik Abduh bin Nik Abdul Aziz, son of Nik Abduk Aziz and Member of Parliamentary seat of Pasir Mas.
 Nik Umar bin Nik Abdul Aziz, son od Nik Abdul Aziz and chairman of Islamic Da'wah Foundation Malaysia (Malay:Yayasan Dakwah Islamiah Malaysia) YADIM.
 Nik Hashim bin Nik Abdul Rahman, Federal Court of Malaysia judge
 Nik Abdul Rashid bin Nik Abdul Majid, former Director of Institute Teknologi MARA (ITM)
 Nik Nazmi bin Nik Ahmad, Member of Selangor State Assembly for Seri Setia
 Nik Ramlah binti Nik Mahmood, managing director of the Securities Commission
 Nik Zainiah binti Nik Abd. Rahman, director general of the Malaysia Productivity Corporation.
 Nik Mustapha bin Raja Abdullah, vice-chancellor of Universiti Putra Malaysia
 Nik Abdul Rashid @ Nik Idris bin Nik Ismail (deceased), Independent Non-Executive Director/Chairman of Kosmo Technology Industrial Berhad. Former Head of Faculty of Business Department Universiti Kebangsaan Malaysia (UKM). former deputy vice-chancellor (UKM), co-chairman of Besta Distributors Sdn Bhd.
 Nik Anuar bin Nik Mahmud, former Professor of History at Universiti Kebangsaan Malaysia
 Nik Safiah binti Nik Abdul Karim, Educationist and champions for women development and rights.
 Nik Muhammad Farith Adruce bin Nik Adelin, TV host and actor
 Nik Ahmad Fadly bin Nik Leh, footballer
 Nik Zul Aziz bin Nik Nawawi, footballer
 Nik Mohd Shahrul Azim bin Nik Abdul Halim, footballer
 Nik Esah binti Nik Ahmed Kamil, compiler of the book Nik's Kitchen, special menus of the Kelantan cuisine.
 Nik Saiful Adli bin Burhan @ Jaohari, Chairman of Gabungan Pelajar Melayu Semenanjung (GPMS) Negeri Kelantan, Asst Secretary of Higher Education Committee of Majlis Belia Malaysia, The Chairman & Founder of  Himpunan Siswazah Kelantan UiTM & Penolong Pengarah BTN Jabatan Perdana Menteri
 Nik Faizah binti Mustapha, Ketua Pergerakan Pandu Puteri Malaysia
Nik Elin Zurina binti Nik Abdul Rashid, Lawyer and human rights activist. Also the daughter of Dato' Nik Abdul Rashid bin Nik Abdul Majid
 Dr. Nik Muhammad Hanis, Phd of Education, Education Consultant
 Nik Fadzli Nik Saleh Raja Ahmad, Founder Asakelate Foundation
 Nik Zulashraf Aizad, crypto currency investor
 Nik Mohammad Izzul Azfar, Founder Cakna Kewangan
 Nik Ahmad Kamal Nik Hashim (PokNik), Dropship Expert
 Nik Iman Salahudin
 Nik Nur Madihah Nik Mohd Kamal, greatest students which scored 19 A1 in 2008 SPM.
 Nik Aliff Qisthi Ahmad Qazzafi, Malaysian Youth
 Professor Emeritus Dato Dr Nik Hassan Shuhaimi Bin Nik Abdul Rahman,merupakan pakar arkeologi dari UKM dan Timbalan Pengarah Akademi Tamadun Melayu (Atma),Universiti Kebangsaan Malaysia(UKM).
 Nik Muhammad Hazim bin Nik Mohamed Hazmi, Chairman of Pertubuhan Kebajikan Nasionalis Insan Jalinan Akrab Malaysia (Ninja Society Malaysia).
 Nik Muhammad Mustaqim Bin Nik Zaidi, Mechanical Engineering student in University of Liverpool, UK. Currently developing shape memory alloy for robotic muscles for fast actuation.

References

External links 
Official website of the Kelantan state government 

Malaysian families
People from Kelantan